Elpmas is an album by the American composer and musician Moondog, released in 1992 via Kopf.

Background and recording
Elpmas was recorded at Academy of St. Martin's in the Streets, a studio in Germany owned by Andi Toma. The album's title is the word "sample" read backwards; it was the first time Moondog used sampling in his music.

Reception
Der Spiegel wrote that the music on Elpmas lies between folk music and minimal music and called it pleasant. "Blue" Gene Tyranny of AllMusic described it as a "wonderful CD built from environmental sounds, gently rocking marimbas, lovely counterpoint for winds, foot-taping rhythms, and sweetly sung wisdom from a chorus". Moondog's biographer Robert Scotto called it "the strangest of his German productions and in many ways the most like his earliest New York albums". He wrote that it primarily appealed to those who appreciated Moondog's eclectic side and propensity to move his music into new phases and that it confused those who expected a unified expression. He called it "a little too much over the edge perhaps".

Track listing

Personnel
 Henry Schuman – oboe
 Peter Wendland – violone, viol
 Johannes Leis – piccolo, saxophone (alto, tenor, bass)
 Götz Alsmann – banjo
 Andi Toma – vocals, whistling
 Akbar Huck – vocals
 Max Alsmann – vocals
 Nobuko Sugai – recitation
 Moondog – keyboards, percussion

References

Citations

Sources

 
 
 

1992 albums
Moondog albums